Nancy McLeón (born May 1, 1971) is a retired female track and field athlete from Cuba who competed in the sprint events during her career.

She won the gold medal in the women's 4 x 400 metres relay at the 1995 Pan American Games, alongside teammates Idalmis Bonne, Surella Morales and Julia Duporty.

International competitions

References

1971 births
Living people
Cuban female sprinters
Olympic athletes of Cuba
Athletes (track and field) at the 1992 Summer Olympics
Pan American Games gold medalists for Cuba
Pan American Games medalists in athletics (track and field)
Athletes (track and field) at the 1991 Pan American Games
Athletes (track and field) at the 1995 Pan American Games
World Athletics Championships athletes for Cuba
Pan American Games silver medalists for Cuba
Universiade medalists in athletics (track and field)
Goodwill Games medalists in athletics
Universiade silver medalists for Cuba
Universiade bronze medalists for Cuba
Medalists at the 1993 Summer Universiade
Medalists at the 1997 Summer Universiade
Competitors at the 1994 Goodwill Games
Medalists at the 1991 Pan American Games
Medalists at the 1995 Pan American Games
Central American and Caribbean Games medalists in athletics
Olympic female sprinters
20th-century Cuban women